Burj Mandi is a village in Chak Jhumra in Faisalabad, Punjab, Pakistan.  It has a railway station on the Faisalabad Sargodha Railway.

It is part of pp51 of Punjab assembly.

Infrastructure
Burj village has a basic health unit, girls elementary school, boys elementary school, post office, UBL branch, telephone service, running water and electricity. A market can be found on the high street where mostly residents do their shoppings. People from the near vicinity also comes to the market to make their shoppings. Mosques are plentiful. This part of faisalabad is irrigated by famous Jhang Branch.

References

External links
 Map

Villages in Faisalabad District